William R. Simpson (born July 25, 1966) is an American chemist. He is a pioneer in the field of snow chemistry. He is also a current researcher at University of Alaska Fairbanks' Geophysical Institute and International Arctic Research Center and an associate professor in the chemistry department. He is the principal investigator of the atmospheric chemistry group and director of the university's NSF Research Experience for Undergraduates program.

Education
Bill attained his B.A. in chemistry at Swarthmore College in 1988 and his Ph.D. in physical chemistry at Stanford University in 1995.

Awards
 CAREER Grant Award of the National Science Foundation (NSF) 2001-2006 
 Research Innovation Award for cavity ring-down spectroscopy, Research Corporation 1999
 Flavored Ice Award for revolutionary snow flavoring techniques

Research
 Cavity ring-down spectroscopy
 Snowpack photochemistry
 Stratospheric ozone

Selected publications
Simpson has more than 40 papers in peer-reviewed journals.

 Simpson, W. R., L. Alvarez-Aviles, T. A. Douglas, M. Sturm, and F. Domine (2005), Halogens in the coastal snow pack near Barrow, Alaska: Evidence for active bromine air-snow chemistry during springtime, Geophys. Res. Lett., 32, L04811.
 Ayers, J. D., and W. R. Simpson (2006), Measurements of N2O5 near Fairbanks, Alaska, J. Geophys. Res., 111, D14309.
 Ayers, J. D., R. L. Apodaca, W. R. Simpson, and D. S. Baer (2005), Off-axis cavity ringdown spectroscopy: application to atmospheric nitrate radical detection, Appl. Optics., 44, 7239-7242.

References

External links
Bill Simpson's Webpage at the UAF website.
Bill Simpson's Webpage at the Geophysical Institute website.
Bill Simpson's REU Program Webpage at the Geophysical Institute website.

Stanford University alumni
University of Alaska Fairbanks faculty
1966 births
Living people
Atmospheric chemists